= Sacramento Regional Builders Exchange =

Professional organization for builders

The Sacramento Regional Builders Exchange (SRBX) is the development industry's oldest and largest association in the Sacramento region. Members include area contractors and subcontractors, suppliers and industry support organizations. SRBX serves the industrial and commercial construction industry by providing education programs, safety programs, bidding information, political advocacy, networking opportunities, and other related information and events for the construction industry.

== History ==
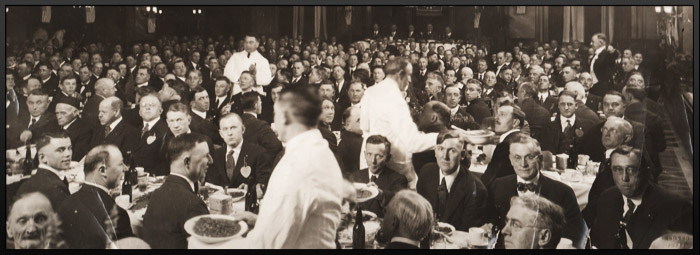
1921 Annual Goose Stew

The Sacramento Regional Builders Exchange dates back to October 1901 when a group of local builders (long before licensed contractors) formed an association for the purpose of discussing common problems and exchanging ideas relating to their crafts. At that time the organization was incorporated as the Builders Association of Sacramento County. The original association has developed into one of the largest and most active Builders’ Exchanges in the Western United States.

Prior to 1916, the Exchange was located in a three-story building at 1013-10th Street, Sacramento. In 1925 it moved to 1508 “J” Street, and became known as the Builders’ Institute of Sacramento. Several years later the Institute consolidated with two other groups and incorporated under its present name: Sacramento Builders’ Exchange, Inc., (Sacramento Regional Builders Exchange) a California non-profit corporation organized to serve the total construction industry.

After operating at four interim locations, the Exchange purchased its present office building site at 14th and “T” Streets in Sacramento in 1949. In January 1951, the Exchange moved into its present office building, which was designed by Leonard F. Starks to meet the special needs of an Exchange operation. Second floor and first floor additions were added in 1955 and 1962, bringing the total building area to 13,700 square feet (1,270 m^{2}). In addition to administrative offices and plan room, the Exchange also has 10 private estimating booths for use by the members. The Exchange office building also has 26 private rental offices, available only to members.

In 1965, the directors purchased additional adjacent property in order to provide more adequate parking for members.

A satellite office was opened in 1987 in Citrus Heights, and later moved to Roseville to better serve those members in the northeastern section of the community. In 2008, the Exchange opened its second satellite office in El Dorado Hills. Due to member demand that office was moved down the street to a larger location and fitted with e-planroom services. As the electronic planroom grew in popularity, the satellite offices were folded back into the Sacramento location.

In 2017, the Sacramento Regional Builders Exchange announced the purchase of a new building, located at 5370 Elvas Avenue in Sacramento, and the pending sale of the 1331 T Street headquarters. The new office features larger event and training spaces and a catering kitchen allowing for more membership events at the new location. Members are also able to rent the event rooms for private meetings and events.

== Board of directors ==
The SRBX Board is composed of fifteen directors, elected by the voting members and the Immediate Past President of the corporation. The board draws its membership from a wide section of the commercial construction industry, and is required to have at least one board member representative coming from the following groups: a General Contractor member, a Professional Member, a Plumbing Subcontractor member, a Sheet Metal Subcontractor member, an Electrical Subcontractor member and Supplier/Material Provider member.
